B. Jagannadha Das (born 27 July 1893) was the second Chief Justice of Orissa High Court and Judge of the Supreme Court of India.

Career 
Jagannadha Das was born in 1893 at Berhampur. He passed from Khallikote College and Madras Presidency College with 1st class in Mathematics. He completed master's degree in Law from the Madras Law College. Besides the legal practice in Madras High Court Jagannadha Das joined Indian National Congress in 1921. He took part in nationalist movement, social works along with Mahatma Gandhi. He was appointed additional judge of Orissa High Court on 26 July 1948 and was elevated to the post of the Chief Justice of this High Court on 31 October 1951. Jagannadha Das also became a judge of the Supreme Court of India in 1953 and retired on 26 July 1958.

References 

1893 births
20th-century Indian judges
Chief Justices of the Orissa High Court
Justices of the Supreme Court of India
People from Ganjam district
Presidency College, Chennai alumni
Year of death missing